Killilan is a remote hamlet, at the base of Ben Killilan, at the east end of Loch Long, in Lochalsh in the Highlands of Scotland and is in the council area of Highland.

References

Populated places in Lochalsh